Elva Martha García Rocha (July 11, 1947 – March 3, 2019) was a Mexican politician and co-founder of the Party of the Democratic Revolution (PRD). She also served as a member of the Legislative Assembly of Mexico City from September 1997 until September 2000.

García Rocha died on March 3, 2019, at the age of 72.

References

1947 births
2019 deaths
Party of the Democratic Revolution politicians
Politicians from Mexico City